Siah Kuh (also Romanized as Sīāh Kūh) is a village in Gurab Zarmikh Rural District, Mirza Kuchek Janghli District, Sowme'eh Sara County, Gilan Province, Iran. At the 2006 census, its population was 414, in 96 families.

References 

Populated places in Sowme'eh Sara County